Pratiggya (English: The Vow) is an Indian film. It was released in 1943.

The cast includes Baby Meena (Meena Kumari) as a child artist.

References

External links
 

1943 films
1940s Hindi-language films
Indian black-and-white films